The National Human Resources Development Institute is a South Korean government agency under the jurisdiction of the Ministry of Personnel Management responsible for the education and training of civil servants. It was established on January 1, 2016 to replace the Central Officials Training Institute.

References

Bibliography 

 
 
 

Government agencies of South Korea
Human resource management